Dudley Township is a township in Clearwater County, Minnesota, in the United States. As of the 2000 census,  the township population was 365.

Dudley Township was named for Frank E. Dudley, a county commissioner.

History 
Voters met and signed a petition in 1899 asking that Township 148, Range 36 be organized as a township under the laws of the state of Minnesota. The laws were followed to the Beltrami County Board's satisfaction and it was ordered that the first election be held Friday, May 19, 1899 at the home of William McCrehin and further ordered that the township be named Dudley.

Geography

Demographics
As of the census of 2000, there were 365 people, 123 households, and 97 families residing in the township.  The population density was 12.3 people per square mile (4.8/km2).  There were 133 housing units at an average density of 4.5/sq mi (1.7/km2).  The racial makeup of the township was 98.90% White, 0.27% Pacific Islander, and 0.82% from two or more races. Hispanic or Latino of any race were 0.27% of the population.

There were 123 households, out of which 44.7% had children under the age of 18 living with them, 68.3% were married couples living together, 4.9% had a female householder with no husband present, and 21.1% were non-families. 19.5% of all households were made up of individuals, and 8.9% had someone living alone who was 65 years of age or older.  The average household size was 2.97 and the average family size was 3.41.

In the township the population was spread out, with 33.2% under the age of 18, 6.3% from 18 to 24, 28.5% from 25 to 44, 21.9% from 45 to 64, and 10.1% who were 65 years of age or older.  The median age was 34 years. For every 100 females, there were 123.9 males.  For every 100 females age 18 and over, there were 114.0 males.

The median income for a household in the township was $32,813, and the median income for a family was $37,188. Males had a median income of $31,944 versus $17,000 for females. The per capita income for the township was $12,049.  About 12.9% of families and 18.5% of the population were below the poverty line, including 24.4% of those under age 18 and 26.3% of those age 65 or over.

References

Townships in Clearwater County, Minnesota
Townships in Minnesota

es:Municipio de Eddy (condado de Clearwater, Minnesota)